Sourav Subrata Sarkar (born 15 December 1984) is an Indian first-class cricketer who plays for Bengal in domestic cricket. He is a right-arm medium-fast bowler. He played for Kolkata Knight Riders in 2009.

References

External links 

1984 births
Living people
Indian cricketers
Bengal cricketers
Kolkata Knight Riders cricketers